The Great Giana Sisters is a 1987 platform game developed by German studio Time Warp Productions and published by Rainbow Arts. The scroll screen melody of the game was composed by Chris Huelsbeck and is a popular Commodore 64 soundtrack. The game is heavily based on Nintendo's Super Mario Bros. (1985), which led to production being stopped shortly after release, but it later inspired a number of sequels.

Plot
The player takes the role of Giana (referred to as "Gianna" in the scrolling intro and also the intended name before a typo was made on the cover art and the developers just went with that rather than having the cover remade), a girl who suffers from a nightmare, in which she travels through 33 stages full of monsters, while collecting ominous diamonds and looking for her sister Maria. If the player wins the final battle, Giana will be awakened by her sister.

Gameplay

The Great Giana Sisters is a 2D side-scrolling arcade game in which the player controls either Giana or her sister Maria. The game supports alternating 2 players, with the second player taking control of Maria.

Each level contains a number of dream crystals, which, when collected, give points to make the game's high score. An extra life can be gained by collecting 100 dream crystals. Extra lives can also be found in the form of hidden "Lollipop" items.

Enemies can be defeated by jumping on them or shooting them after obtaining the relevant power-ups. The enemies include owls, rolling eyeballs, flesh-eating fish and deadly insects. The "fire wheel" transforms Giana into a punk with the ability to crush rocks by jumping and hitting them from below. The "lightning bolt" awards Giana "dream bubbles", a single projectile shot. "Double lightning" gives her the ability to shoot recoiling projectiles. "Strawberries" give her the ability to shoot homing projectiles. There is one defensive item in the game, the "water drop", which protects Giana against fire. A number of special items can also be triggered that affect the entire screen, such as the "clock", which freezes all enemies on-screen, and the "magic bombs", which kill all enemies. These items are found in the item blocks scattered around the stages.

There are two types of stages in the game: an "overworld" and an "underground" stage. The "overworld" stages feature green scenery and pipe-shaped objects, along with bottomless pits for Giana to avoid. The "underground" stages feature additional hazards such as water and fire, as well as bosses.

There are a total of 33 stages in the game. Hidden "warp blocks" can be found to jump through portions of the game.

Story 
One night, when little Giana from Milano was fast asleep, she had a strange dream. Everybody dreams weird things at night, but no-one will have experienced situations like Giana is about to. Giana suddenly finds herself in a stange mysterious world, where everything is completely different. Gravity has almost dissappeared - and everywhere there are unexplainable buildings and structures. Old grottos and deserted castles seem to hide lots of secrets, and frightening and hideous creatures appear. This wouldn't be too bad, except that Giana can't leave this world unless she finds the magic, huge diamond. She starts searching for this wonderful jevel, but she is not totally alone, for her little sister Maria can dream too.

Development 
The Great Giana Sisters was programmed by Armin Gessert, with graphics by Manfred Trenz and a soundtrack composed by Chris Huelsbeck under the label of Time Warp Production Inc. The first original game version was released in 1987 on Commodore 64. Shortly after, it was released on Amiga, Amstrad CPC and Atari ST. The license is held by Black Forest Games, who have developed the sequel Giana Sisters: Twisted Dreams.

Alleged lawsuit 
According to several urban legends, Nintendo initiated a copyright infringement lawsuit against Time Warp Productions and Rainbow Arts because of similarities to its new game Super Mario Bros., but there has never been such a lawsuit. Rather, Nintendo directly influenced The Great Giana Sisters being withdrawn from sale, as the company had already done with other games.

According to an interview with Chris Huelsbeck, Nintendo threatened the developers in a letter, but no lawsuit was filed.

Several factors influenced the withdrawal of the game, including conspicuous similarities: the general gameplay and the first level of The Great Giana Sisters are nearly identical in layout to the first stage found in Nintendo's Super Mario Bros. The immediate similarity to Super Mario Bros. ensured that The Great Giana Sisters was quickly noticed by both the public and the video game industry itself. Nintendo urged the makers of The Great Giana Sisters to withdraw the game from sale, arguing that it was obvious copyright infringement. Time Warp Productions and Rainbow Arts immediately stopped production and, at the same time, the game began vanishing from stores. The rarity of the game has led to copies of it becoming collector's items.

Release
The game has been ported to numerous systems since its release. A planned port for the ZX Spectrum was reviewed in magazines, though eventually cancelled due to legal pressures. In 1993, Dutch publisher Sunrise released a version for the MSX2, programmed by Jan van Valburg. Unofficially, the game has been cloned on Windows, DOS, Linux, Mac OS X, AmigaOS 4, NetBSD, AROS, MorphOS, and Symbian OS. An unofficial clone of the Commodore 64 version was also made for the Nintendo DS.

Reception

Upon its release, The Great Giana Sisters received strong critical praise and acclaim from the gaming magazines across Europe. Zzap!64 described the game as "amazing" and concluded with the overall opinion that Great Giana Sisters was "a fabulous, compelling and constantly rewarding arcade adventure". Powerplay's review stated that they felt the game did not live up to the standards set by Super Mario Bros., but "still achieves being an entertaining pleasure".

Despite never seeing a release, the ZX Spectrum version gained favorable reviews from Spectrum-based magazines. Crash noted that the game was "highly addictive and great fun to play. Plenty of hidden passages and surprise features should keep you hooked for weeks".

Great Giana Sisters has gained a strong cult following over the years, citing its strong soundtrack and unique charm.

Chris Hülsbeck's soundtrack for the game has become one of the most popular video game soundtracks of all time. It has received over 50 remixes on the popular music arrangement resource Remix64. The music of Great Giana Sisters was featured in the live orchestra concert Symphonic Shades held in Cologne, Germany on August 23, 2008. The arrangement was made by Jonne Valtonen, and performed by the WDR Radio Orchestra. The concert was the first video game orchestra concert to be broadcast live on radio. The concert recording received an album release in 2009. The album is now out of print, but can still be bought digitally through Amazon.

Since 2009, with endorsement of Manfred Trenz, a fan-made open-source remake of the C64 version, called OpenGGS, was in development and is hosted on SourceForge. The remake was ported to mobile devices like the Pandora in 2015.

Sequels

Hard'n'Heavy
Shortly after the release of The Great Giana Sisters, Time Warp began developing a sequel which was announced as Giana 2: Arthur and Martha in Future World, a new game with a futuristic setting. Due to the trouble caused by the legal pressure coming from Nintendo, it was deemed too risky for the small developer to once again produce a game associated with the Giana Sisters brand. Time Warp renamed the game Hard'n'Heavy, and changed the game's protagonists into robots rather than the Giana sisters. Hard'n'Heavy was released on the Commodore 64, Amiga and Atari ST in 1989.

Giana Sisters DS
In April 2009, publisher DTP Entertainment and developer Spellbound Entertainment, then owner of the game's intellectual property, released a new Giana Sisters game in Europe with a graphical update for the Nintendo DS, titled Giana Sisters DS. It has been released in Australia. The game features all-new levels and more gameplay elements, and a recreation of the original game's levels can be unlocked. Giana Sisters DS was released in North America in February 2011 by publisher Destineer, though their official website does not have it listed, and is only available through several retailers such as Walmart and Newegg.com.

A mobile version of the game, titled Giana Sisters, was released for Android phones in 2009 and iOS in 2010.

Giana Sisters 2D 
Giana Sisters 2D is an HD remake of the Nintendo DS game. It was released in October 2015 for the PC.

Giana Sisters: Twisted Dreams
In 2012, Black Forest Games started a Kickstarter campaign for a new installment of The Great Giana Sisters, originally titled Project Giana and later retitled Giana Sisters: Twisted Dreams, describing the project as "the grandchild of The Great Giana Sisters". The Kickstarter was funded successfully, netting $186,158 with a goal of $150,000. The game, which is described as a direct sequel to Giana Sisters DS, features music from The Great Giana Sisters original composer Chris Huelsbeck (in cooperation with Fabian Del Priore) and the Swedish "SID metal" band Machinae Supremacy. Giana Sisters: Twisted Dreams was released on October 23 for PC with later releases on Xbox Live Arcade, PlayStation Network, Nintendo eShop, and possibly on Ouya.

Giana Sisters: Dream Runners
Giana Sisters: Dream Runners is a multiplayer-focused platform game. It was released in August 2015 for the PC, PlayStation 4 and Xbox One. It received negative reviews.

References

External links
 

1987 video games
Amiga games
Amstrad CPC games
Cancelled ZX Spectrum games
Commodore 64 games
MacOS games
MSX2 games
Nintendo DS games
IOS games
Giana Sisters
Side-scrolling platform games
Video games about nightmares
Video game clones
Unauthorized video games
Video games scored by Chris Huelsbeck
Video games scored by Jochen Hippel
Video games developed in Germany
Video games featuring female protagonists
Video games involved in plagiarism controversies
Android (operating system) games
Symbian games
Cooperative video games
Rainbow Arts games